Yazīd ibn Hurmuz al-Fārisī was the chief of the Umayyad  in Medina, but led the city's  against the Umayyad army at the Battle of al-Harra in 683.

Life
Yazid ibn Hurmuz was a Persian  (client or freedman) of the Umayyad clan and chief of clan's  in Medina during the reign of the Umayyad caliph Yazid I. His brother Abd Allah ibn Hurmuz was a chief of the Umayyads'  in Kufa during the reign of Yazid I's father, Caliph Mu'awiya I. He was possibly tasked with helping enforce tax collection and later oversaw the army registers of Iraq under the Umayyad governor, al-Hajjaj ibn Yusuf. After his death in a campaign against the forces of the anti-Umayyad caliph Abd Allah ibn al-Zubayr, his son Abd al-Rahman succeeded him.

During the Second Muslim Civil War (680–692), the people of Medina rebelled against Caliph Yazid, and the latter dispatched an expeditionary force from Syria to suppress the Medinese. The latter assaulted this part of the trench and called on Yazid ibn Hurmuz to surrender, but his forces held the Syrians off. In contrast, another unit of the Medinese, from the local Banu Haritha family, opened their quarter to the Syrians, allowing them to attack the Medinese defenders from the rear and rout them.

Yazid ibn Hurmuz was cited by early Islamic historians as a transmitter of reports. He died during the reign of the Umayyad caliph Umar II.

References

Sources

 

7th-century people from the Umayyad Caliphate
8th-century deaths
7th-century Iranian people
People of the Second Fitna
History of Medina